Villanueva de la Torre is a municipality located in the province of Guadalajara, Castile-La Mancha, Spain. The village has a surface of 11,09 km ² with a population of 6321 inhabitants according to the municipal census of the year 2009 and a density of 569,97 inhabitants/km ².

Villanueva de la Torre es un municipio situado en la provincia de Guadalajara, Castilla-La Mancha, España. El pueblo cuenta con una superficie de 11,09 km ² con una población de 6.321 habitantes según el padrón municipal del año 2009 y una densidad de 569,97 hab / km ².

Municipalities in the Province of Guadalajara